Strumaria phonolithica is a species of plant that is endemic to Namibia. Its bulbs form large clumps. Its narrow funnel-shaped flowers are, with Strumaria babarae, the largest in the genus. It is found mountainous regions, where its natural habitats are subtropical or tropical dry shrubland and rocky areas.

References

Flora of Namibia
phonolithica
Plants described in 1923
Least concern plants
Taxonomy articles created by Polbot
Taxa named by Kurt Dinter